Frederick Andrew Laurence (April 23, 1843 – February 13, 1912) was a Canadian politician.

Born in Port Hood, Nova Scotia, Laurence was educated at the Provincial Normal School of Nova Scotia and at Dalhousie University. A lawyer, he ran unsuccessfully as the Liberal candidate for the House of Commons of Canada for the electoral district of Colchester in the 1882 federal election. He was elected to the Nova Scotia House of Assembly for Colchester in 1886 and was re-elected in 1890, 1894, 1897 and 1901. A Nova Scotia Liberal, he was Speaker of the House of Assembly from 1895 to 1901 and from 1903 to 1904. He was elected to the Canadian House of Commons in the 1904 federal election. He resigned in 1907 when he was appointed a judge.

Electoral record

References
 The Canadian Parliament; biographical sketches and photo-engravures of the senators and members of the House of Commons of Canada. Being the tenth Parliament, elected November 3, 1904
 

1843 births
1912 deaths
Dalhousie University alumni
Liberal Party of Canada MPs
Members of the House of Commons of Canada from Nova Scotia
Nova Scotia Liberal Party MLAs
Speakers of the Nova Scotia House of Assembly
People from Inverness County, Nova Scotia